Tea Hiilloste (born 31 October 1982 in Hämeenkoski) is a Finnish singer and television presenter. She was a member of girl group Jane and she has started a solo career after the group disbanded. Her 2007 single "Tytöt tykkää" peaked at number one in Finnish Singles Chart.

Discography

Albums
 2007 - Tytöt tykkää
 2008 - Hey C'mon!
 2013 - Mehudisko

Singles
 2007- "Tytöt tykkää"
 2007 - Tontut tykkää
 2008 - C'mon C'mon (feat. Remu Aaltonen)
 2010 - Auringonlaskuun (feat. Stig Dogg)
 2013 - Sormista sakset

Promotional
 2007 - Puhu mun kädelle
 2008 - Tea-4-2

Other songs
 2007 - Moi Me Bailataan (feat. Skidit) 
 2011 - Mehudisco (feat. Kana)

References

1982 births
Living people
21st-century Finnish women singers
People from Hollola